Volodymyr Naumenko may refer to:

 Volodymyr Pavlovych Naumenko, Ukrainian statesman of the 19th century
 Volodymyr Vasylyovych Naumenko, Soviet footballer from Ukraine